Notable events of 2006 in webcomics.

Events

Platinum Studios purchases website DrunkDuck, with the purpose of publishing comic books online before creating physical releases.
Webcomics collective ACT-I-VATE debuted in February.

Awards
Web Cartoonist's Choice Awards, "Outstanding Comic" won by Nicholas Gurewitch's The Perry Bible Fellowship.
Clickburg Webcomic Awards, won by Liz Greenfield, Stephan Brusche, and Daniel Merlin Goodbrey.
Ignatz Awards, "Outstanding Online Comic" won by Nicholas Gurewitch's The Perry Bible Fellowship.
Eagle Awards, "Favourite Web-Based Comic" won by Batton Lash's Supernatural Law.
Eisner Awards, "Best Digital Comic" won by Scott Kurtz' PvP.
Harvey Awards, "Best Online Comics Work" won by James Kochalka's American Elf.
Weblog Awards, "Best Comic Strip" won by Ryan Sohmer and Lar deSouza's Least I Could Do.

Webcomics started

 January 5 — The Dreamland Chronicles by Scott Christian Sava
 January 22 — San Antonio Rock City by Mitch Clem
 January 27 — The Jimi Homeless Experience (webcomic) by J.F. Kinyon
 February 9 — minus by Ryan Armand
 February 8 — The New Adventures Of Queen Victoria, by Pab Sungenis
 February 13 — Married to the Sea by Drew and Natalie Dee
 March 1 — Planet Karen by Karen Ellis
 April 16 — Fission Chicken by J.P. Morgan
 April 18 — Tonari no 801-chan by Ajiko Kojima
 April – Rice Boy by Evan Dahm
 June — Cheshire Crossing by Andy Weir
 July 19 — Lackadaisy by Tracy Butler
 July — What the Duck by Aaron Johnson
 September 20— Awkward Zombie by Katie Tiedrich
 November 6 — Looking For Group by Ryan Sohmer and Lar DeSouza
 November 11  Skin Deep  by Kory Bingaman
 December 7 — Erfworld by Rob Balder and Jamie Noguchi
 December 25 — Last Blood by Bobby Crosby and Owen Gieni
 The Sound of Heart by Jo Seok

Webcomics ended
 Doctor Fun by David Farley, 1993 – 2006
 Narbonic by Shaenon K. Garrity, 2000 – 2006
 Mac Hall by Ian McConville and Matt Boyd, 2000 – 2006
 Anima: Age of the Robots by Johnny Tay, 2003 – 2006
 Sokora Refugees by Semaui and Melissa Dejesus, 2004 – 2006 
 Concerned: The Half-Life and Death of Gordon Frohman by Christopher C. Livingston, 2005 – 2006

References

 
Webcomics by year